Arnold Friberg (December 21, 1913 – July 1, 2010) was an American illustrator and painter noted for his religious and patriotic works. He is perhaps best known for his 1975 painting The Prayer at Valley Forge, a depiction of George Washington praying at Valley Forge. He is also well known for his 15 "pre-visualization" paintings for the Cecil B. DeMille film The Ten Commandments which were used to promote the film worldwide and for which he received an Academy Award nomination.

He has been admitted as a lifetime member of the Royal Society of Arts.  He also did a series of paintings depicting scenes from the Book of Mormon for Adele Cannon Howells, the Primary President of the Church of Jesus Christ of Latter-day Saints.

Biography
Friberg was born to a Swedish father and a Norwegian mother. His family moved to Arizona when he was three years old, and he began drawing cartoons by the time he was seven.  When he was seven, Friberg's parents joined the Church of Jesus Christ of Latter-day Saints.  Friberg was baptized a member of the LDS Church at age eight.

While in high school, Friberg learned by meeting with the artists at The Arizona Republic, and earned money by creating signs for local businesses while being apprenticed to a local sign painter.

After graduating from high school, Friberg attended the Chicago Academy of Fine Arts, working for various local printers doing commercial art while attending school and for several years afterward. This included calendar work for the Northwest Paper Company, for whom he created paintings of Mounties. Friberg has created more than 200 paintings depicting Mounties, and he is the only American made an honorary member of the Royal Canadian Mounted Police (RCMP). In 1940, Friberg moved to New York City and studied with Norman Rockwell under the artist Harvey Dunn at the Grand Central School of Art.

With the outbreak of World War II Friberg left the Grand Central School of Art and joined the United States Army serving in the 86th Infantry Division.  He had an offer of the rank of captain to draw recruitment posters for the United States Army Air Corps but chose instead to go to the front.  He did, however, use his art skills in combat to draw maps.

Move to Utah
Shortly after the end of the war and setting up shop in San Francisco, Friberg married Hedve Baxter.  He made it big creating a series of paintings depicting Western scenes for a calendar company in 1948.  Friberg moved to Utah in 1950 in order to begin teaching commercial art at the University of Utah.  This was partly due to having become friends with Avard Fairbanks on a previous visit to Salt Lake City and also a result of doctors recommending that Hedve move to a drier climate for her health.

When the Fribergs arrived in Utah, Arnold was asked to commemorate a centennial event by recreating on canvas the first pioneer Sunday school taught by Richard Ballantyne. Delighted with the painting,  Adele Cannon Howells, the Primary President of the Church of Jesus Christ of Latter-day Saints wanted to commission Friberg to create twelve paintings depicting the Book of Mormon for The Primary's published magazine called The Children's Friend. Financing for taking on such a project was an obstacle as there was not enough in the budget of the magazine to cover the cost of an artist, nor would the church supply any funding. Therefore, Howells funded the project herself by selling her own land.

At the time, reproductions and special editions were printed and sold, however no one knew these paintings would have so much impact that the Church would decide to put them in all copies of the Book of Mormon. They also caught the eye of Hollywood scouts searching for an artist for Cecil B. DeMille's epic motion picture The Ten Commandments. DeMille was shown some of Friberg's paintings by a publisher friend and hired him. Starting in 1953, Friberg spent three years in Hollywood as DeMille's chief artist and designer working on the previsualization paintings for The Ten Commandments. Friberg's paintings included costume design for the main characters, for which he received a nomination for an Academy Award.

In 1968, Friberg was commissioned by Chevrolet to create a series of paintings showing the greatest moments in college football, including The First Game, played in New Brunswick, New Jersey on November 6, 1869 between Rutgers College and the visiting College of New Jersey, for use in their 1969 advertising campaign. After extensive research on the location during winter and the equipment and gear used by Revolutionary War soldiers, Friberg created his 1975 painting The Prayer at Valley Forge. This depicts George Washington praying while the Continental Army winters at Valley Forge in Pennsylvania during 1777 and 1778. In 1977, he was commissioned to create a series of saloon paintings for the Golden Nugget in Las Vegas, Nevada.

Due to his previous work with the RCMP, Friberg was commissioned to paint the Prince of Wales and his horse Centennial (great-grandson of Man o' War). This led to an additional commission in 1990 to paint a portrait of Queen Elizabeth II, also with Centennial. Both portraits were painted at Buckingham Palace.

Friberg died on July 1, 2010, while recovering from hip replacement surgery in a Salt Lake City care center.

Partial list of works
Listed alphabetically by title.

See also
 Mormon art

References

External links
 Collection on Arnold Friberg at L. Tom Perry Special Collections Library, Brigham Young University
 Arnold Friberg paintings for The Ten Commandments at L. Tom Perry Special Collections Library, Brigham Young University

Further reading
 

1913 births
2010 deaths
American Latter Day Saint artists
20th-century American painters
American male painters
21st-century American painters
21st-century American male artists
Artists from Utah
Grand Central School of Art alumni
Modern painters
Artists from Chicago
School of the Art Institute of Chicago alumni
University of Utah faculty
American people of Swedish descent
American people of Norwegian descent
People from Winnetka, Illinois
Latter Day Saints from Arizona
Latter Day Saints from Illinois
Latter Day Saints from New York (state)
Latter Day Saints from Utah
20th-century American male artists